Events from the year 1260 in Ireland.

Incumbent
Lord: Henry III

Events

Battle of Down; defeat and death of Brian O’Neill.
Grey Abbey in County Kildare was founded by William de Vesci. It was run by Franciscan friars.

Births
Roger Utlagh, or Roger Outlawe (d. 1341) was a leading Irish cleric, judge and statesman of the fourteenth century who held the office of Lord Chancellor of Ireland.

Deaths
Tadhg Mac Conchubair mic Donncaidh I Briain. His death recorded in Mac Carthaigh's Book as "a fortunate event for the Galls"

References

 
1260s in Ireland
Ireland
Years of the 13th century in Ireland